Shoro is a village in the Naryn District, Naryn Region of Kyrgyzstan. Its population was 618 in 2021.

References 

Populated places in Naryn Region